There are two species of lizard named Sonoran collared lizard:
 Crotaphytus nebrius
 Crotaphytus dickersonae